

Acts of the Northern Ireland Assembly

|-
| {{|Welfare Reform Act (Northern Ireland) 2007|ania|2|29-06-2007|maintained=y|archived=n|An Act to make provision about social security and for connected purposes.}}
|-
| {{|Children (Emergency Protection Orders) Act (Northern Ireland) 2007|ania|3|14-12-2007|maintained=y|archived=n|An Act to repeal Article 64(8) of the Children (Northern Ireland) Order 1995.}}
}}

References

2007